Oh Those Glorious Old Student Days (German: O alte Burschenherrlichkeit) is a 1925 German silent film directed by Eugen Rex and Heinz Schall and starring Eugen Klöpfer, Maria Zelenka, and Hans Mierendorff.

The film's sets were designed by the art director Karl Machus.

Cast
 Eugen Klöpfer
 Maria Zelenka
 Hans Mierendorff
 Eugen Rex
 Frida Richard
 Charles Willy Kayser
 Karl Beckersachs
 Walter Slezak
 Otto Reinwald
 Kurt Gerron
 Rosa Valetti
 Hermann Picha
 Hugo Fischer-Köppe
 Karl Harbacher
 Hilde Jary
 Hilde Jennings
 Theo Körner
 Clementine Plessner
 Lydia Potechina
 Paul Rehkopf
 Ida Wüst

References

Bibliography
 Bock, Hans-Michael & Bergfelder, Tim. The Concise CineGraph. Encyclopedia of German Cinema. Berghahn Books, 2009.

External links

1925 films
Films of the Weimar Republic
Films directed by Eugen Rex
Films directed by Heinz Schall
German silent feature films
German black-and-white films